Mack Daughtry (born July 20, 1946) is an American former professional basketball player who spent one season in the American Basketball Association (ABA) with the Carolina Cougars during the 1970–71 season. He attended Albany State University. He was drafted by the Atlanta Hawks in the eighth round of the 1968 NBA draft.

Early life and education
Daughtry grew up in Enigma, Georgia and attended college at Albany State.

References

External links
 

1946 births
Living people
Albany State Golden Rams men's basketball players
American men's basketball players
Atlanta Hawks draft picks
Basketball players from Georgia (U.S. state)
Carolina Cougars players
Guards (basketball)